= Adam Shagai =

- Location within Pakistan
- Coordinates: 34.91°N 71.47°E
- Country: Pakistan
- Territory: Federally Administered Tribal Areas
- Elevation: 1,211 m (3,973 ft)
- Time zone: UTC+5 (PST)
  - Summer (DST): UTC+6 (PDT)

Adam Shagai is a town in the Federally Administered Tribal Areas of Pakistan. It is located at 34°54'39N 71°28'0E with an altitude of 1211 metres (3976 feet).
